Tall Firs are an American, New York City based underground electric folk rock band, originally formed in 1990 by teenagers Dave Mies and Aaron Mullan in Annapolis, Maryland. Their album, Tall Firs, was completed and released sixteen years later in 2006 on the independent music label Ecstatic Peace!.

Tall Firs grew out of an over-the-phone collaboration between Mies and Mullan, school friends who lived too far apart to walk to one another's houses. Allegedly, the two sat at home and cued up cassettes from the Circle Jerks and Sex Pistols to play over simultaneously. They did not play their first concert until eleven years later.

History
In 2006, the band was signed to Ecstatic Peace!. Their first album, Tall Firs, was made in the Sonic Youth studio.

The band is based in Brooklyn, New York.

Tall Firs' second album, entitled Too Old to Die Young, was released in March 2008 and includes the contribution of drummer/ vocalist, Ryan Sawyer, who toured and collaborated with the band as a full-time member until 2011.

Tall Firs were chosen to perform at the All Tomorrow's Parties festival that he curated in March 2012 in Minehead, England.

In November 2013, the band played the final holiday camp edition of the All Tomorrow's Parties festival in Camber Sands, England.

Members
Mullan began collaborating with Chris Corsano before moving on to work as a sound engineer and instrumentalist. He also plays bass guitar in the trio Hallogallo with Michael Rother and Steve Shelly.

Mies fronted a blues-rock band in Baltimore, backed by the Emo performers Colin Seven (Universal Order of Armageddon) and Monica DiGialleonardo (Moss Icon) before joining Mullan in New York to begin Tall Firs.

Drummer Sawyer is from Texas and was one of the first drummers in the band At the Drive-In. He moved to New York City in 1997 and has recorded or played live with acts such as Mekons, Massive Attack, TV on the Radio and The Fiery Furnaces. In addition to his role in Tall Firs, he is a member of Stars Like Fleas and Eye Contact. Sawyer participated as drummer 62 in the Boredoms 77 Boadrum performance on July 7, 2007, at the Empire-Fulton Ferry State Park in Brooklyn.

References

External links
 
 Ecstatic Peace! page for Tall Firs
 Interview: January 7, 2007
 Listen to "The Woods" by Tall Firs
  77 Boadrum Site Profile Viva Radio, September 2007.  (Flash)

American folk rock groups
Indie rock musical groups from Maryland
Ecstatic Peace! artists
ATP Recordings artists